Eligmodontia typus is a species of rodent in the family Cricetidae. It is found in Argentina and possibly also Chile. The northernmost population might represent a distinct species, E. bolsonensis, to which the common name highland gerbil mouse would apply. The lowland population would then be known as eastern Patagonian gerbil mouse or eastern Patagonian laucha.

References

Eligmodontia
Mammals of Argentina
Mammals of Chile
Mammals of the Andes
Mammals described in 1837
Taxa named by Frédéric Cuvier
Taxonomy articles created by Polbot